The 2013–14 season was Hellas Verona Football Club's first season in Serie A in eleven years. The club finished 10th in Serie A, and were eliminated in the fourth round of the Coppa Italia.

Players

Squad information

Competitions

Serie A

League table

Results summary

Results by round

Matches

Coppa Italia

References

Hellas Verona F.C. seasons
Hellas Verona